The Blue Stone is a monument in the city of Bergen, Norway. It is resting on a stone block, which gives it a characteristic inclination towards the northeast. The entire sculpture is placed on a larger foundation along with a smaller gray square stone sculpture that appears as a cover to an opening at the end of the foundation. It is considered a typical meeting point for the locals. In 2007 the rock was covered with pink plastic as a part of a marketing stunt, and after the 2011 Norway attacks it was used as a memorial site and covered with flowers.

The monument was made by Asbjørn Andersen, and presented to the city 27 March 1993 as a gift from the Kavli Trust, who were celebrating their 100th anniversary.

References 

Tourist attractions in Bergen